The Ecole Supérieure de Danse de Cannes Rosella Hightower (formerly Centre de Danse International Rosella Hightower) is a dance school created by the prima ballerina Rosella Hightower in 1961 in Cannes, on the French Riviera. The school is currently a very important dance training center in ballet, contemporary dance and modern jazz.

Historic
Rosella Hightower, eager to offer a comprehensive and multidisciplinary training decides the opening of her dance school in Cannes, the Centre de Danse International Rosella Hightower located in the former "Hotel Gallia" in the district of California - Pezou in Cannes then in the neighboring commune in Mougins. This will become a true school ahead of its time, places where many artists came out, it appeared originally as a unique structure in his day.

The dance school allowed to train young people of all nationalities, combining a rigorous education in ballet technic but also various forms of expression, such as contemporary dance, Modern jazz, drama , adage, pas de deux, boy technique, the bar on the ground, the functional analysis of the body in dance movement, dance history, music training, singing, mime, character dance, piano ... while giving them the opportunity to follow normal schooling, and created the very first arranged schedules with academic classes.

Rosella Hightower left the leadership of the school in 2001. She named her successor, the dancer Monique Loudières, former star of the Paris Opera Ballet who became head of the school from 2001 to 2009. Then Paola Cantalupo, former star of the Monte Carlo Ballet, takes the school management from 2009. The school acquired a worldwide reputation, many dancers and choreographers come here to train or teach, such as Anton Dolin, Serge Lifar, Rudolf Nureyev, Maurice Bejart, Nima Kiann, Gilles Jobin.

In addition to the famous school, Rosella Hightower created in 1984 the Cannes Dance Festival which undoubtedly is one of the largest international dance festivals and in 1973 the famous Prix de Lausanne, international competition for young dancers initiated by Elvire and Philippe Braunschweig.

Education
The École Supérieure de Danse de Cannes Rosella Hightower offers different courses:
 The Dance-academic cycle (11 to 18)(Professional program).
 The Cannes Jeune Ballet cycle, including Higher National Diploma Professional dancer (DNSP D) (18–23 years)(Professional program).
 The Diploma of dance teacher (from 18 years).
 The Free artistic practice open to the public with dance classes.

Direction
 1961-2001 : Rosella Hightower
 2001-2009 : Monique Loudières
 Since 2009 : Paola Cantalupo

Website link
 Official website

Dance schools in France
1961 establishments in France
Cannes